Beaver Edge is an unincorporated community in the town of Beaver Dam, Dodge County, Wisconsin, United States. The community lies on the east shore of Beaver Dam Lake.

Notes

Unincorporated communities in Dodge County, Wisconsin
Unincorporated communities in Wisconsin